Noyant is a former commune in the Maine-et-Loire department in western France. On 15 December 2016, it was merged into the new commune Noyant-Villages. The archivist and historian François Jourda de Vaux de Foletier (1893–1988) was born in Noyant

See also 
Communes of the Maine-et-Loire department

References 

Former communes of Maine-et-Loire